Otilio Alba Polo (1915 – 18 March 1941) was a Spanish Catalan politician. He was born in Barcelona. He supported the Second Spanish Republic during the Spanish Civil War. After the victory of the Nationalists, he was executed by the government of Francisco Franco.

References
HUERTAS, Josep / RIBAS, Antoni et al.: Vint anys de resistencia catalana (1939-1959), 1978. .
MARTÍNEZ DE SAS, María Teresa.: ''Diccionari biogràfic del moviment obrer als països catalans, pp. 52.

1915 births
1941 deaths
Politicians from Catalonia
People executed by Francoist Spain